Fiction Factory were a Scottish new wave band from Perth. Formed in 1982, they are best known for their single "(Feels Like) Heaven", which peaked at #6 on the UK Singles Chart. The song was written by Eddie Jordan and Kevin Patterson.

History
Before they began Fiction Factory in 1982, Kevin Patterson (vocals), Eddie Jordan (keyboards), Grant Taylor (trumpet) and Chic Medley (guitar) played in skinhead ska band The Rude Boys (later shortened to The RBs). Asked by CBS to create a concert-playing band, they enlisted Graham McGregor (bass) and Mike Ogletree (drums and percussion), a former member of Simple Minds and Café Jacques. Influences on Fiction Factory included Kraftwerk, Magazine, and Orchestral Manoeuvres in the Dark (OMD), whom Patterson described as "a big favourite". Patterson's vocal style was influenced by the Walker Brothers, Sparks, and Magazine's Howard Devoto.

The band frequented Bandwagon Music Supplies in Perth. "They would come into my shop wanting to hear their recording on my wee cassette recorder that turned out to be a number six single that still gets played today," said Pete Caban, the shop's owner. "I still see the guys, they still come in." The shop closed in 2020 after 37 years in business.

The band's single "(Feels Like) Heaven" became a UK Top 10 hit in 1984 (also reaching the Top 10 in Belgium, Germany, Italy, Ireland and Switzerland); it was their only success in the UK. The follow-up single "Ghost of Love" only reached no. 64 on the singles chart, while the parent album Throw the Warped Wheel Out did not reach the chart at all. Fiction Factory had more success in Europe with "(Feels Like) Heaven" reaching no. 2 in Switzerland and the Top 20 in several countries, "Ghost of Love" spending 11 weeks on the German singles chart  and Throw the Warped Wheel Out charting in Switzerland (no. 23), Sweden (no. 34) and Germany (no. 57).

In 1984 Fiction Factory toured Europe as support for OMD, but the same year Jordan, McGregor and Ogletree departed from the band. Patterson and Medley recorded the next album with session musicians, including keyboardist Paul Wishart and brothers Graham and Neil Weir of OMD.  

Fiction Factory disbanded in 1987 after the release of their second album Another Story had become a commercial flop. Patterson left the music industry soon afterwards. He now works in IT and is married with two children. Patterson and Jordan reunited to perform "(Feels Like) Heaven" with a backing band at the latter's wedding in August 2007. Medley went on to work with the Scottish world music project, Mouth Music.

In 2011, the original line-up reformed for the first time since 1984 for their performance at that year's Rewind Festival.

In 2016, Manic Street Preachers covered "(Feels Like) Heaven" for the album BBC Radio 2 Sounds of the 80s, Volume 2.

In 2019, "(Feels Like) Heaven" was used in Episode 5 of Netflix's The Umbrella Academy.

In 2022, They performed at the Belgian "W-Festival" in Ostend.

Line-up
Kevin Patterson: vocals (1982–1987, 2007, 2011,2022)
Chic (Charles) Medley: guitars (1982–1987, 2011, 2022)
Graham McGregor: bass (1982–1984, 2011)
Eddie (Edward) Jordan: keyboards (1982–1984, 2007, 2011, 2022)
Mike Ogletree: drums and percussion (1982–1984, 2011, 2022)
Grant Taylor: trumpet (1983–1984) (played on first album)
Paul Wishart: keyboards (1985–1987) (played on second album)
Graham Weir: trombone (1985) (played on first & second album)
Neil Weir: trumpet (1985) (played on first & second album)
James Locke: drums and percussions (1985) (played on second album)
Pim Jones: guitar (1985) (played on second album)
Marwenna Laidlaw: (1985) (backing vocalist on second album)
Fiona Carlin: (1985) (sang on second album)
 Bill Montague: Bass (2022) W-Fest, Ostend, Belgium
Ali Napier: additional Keyboards and Vocals (2022) W-Fest, Ostend, Belgium
Leon Thorne: Guitar and Sax (2022) W-Fest, Ostend, Belgium

Discography

Studio albums

Singles

References

External links
 

Musicians from Perth, Scotland
Musical groups established in 1983
Musical groups disestablished in 1987
Musical groups reestablished in 2007
Musical groups disestablished in 2007
Musical groups reestablished in 2011
Musical groups disestablished in 2011
Scottish new wave musical groups
British synth-pop new wave groups
CBS Records artists